A duma is a Russian assembly.

Duma may also refer to:

Arts 
 Duma (2005 film), an American adventure film
 Duma (2011 film), an Israeli documentary
 Duma (band), a Kenyan-Ugandan industrial grindcore band
 Duma (DC Comics), a character in The Sandman comic book series
 Duma (epic), poetry of the Ukrainian Cossacks
 Dumka (musical genre), an instrumental musical genre inspired by the Duma epic

People 
 Duma Nokwe (1927–1978), South African anti-apartheid activist
 Christian Duma (born 1982), German athlete
 Duma people (or Adouma), an ethnic group of Gabon

Places 
 Duma, Hama, a village in the Hama district, Syria
 Duma, Nablus, a Palestinian town in the West Bank
 Duma, Syria, a city in Syria
 Duma, a village in Dereneu Commune, Călăraşi district, Moldova
 Duma al-Jandal, ancient city in Saudi Arabia
 In casual speech or on social media, the Philippine city of Dumaguete is often abbreviated to "Duma"

Politics 
 City Duma, a city-level Russian representative assembly
 State Duma, the lower house of parliament of the Russian Federation
 State Duma (Russian Empire), the legislative assembly in the Russian Empire

Other 
 Duma (plant), a genus of plants in the family Polygonaceae
 Duma language, a Bantu language spoken in Gabon

See also
 
 Douma (disambiguation)
 Dumah (disambiguation)
 Dumas (disambiguation)